Jordan Corvée (born 13 February 1995) is a French badminton player. He began playing badminton in Alençon at aged 6 with his mother and brother Lucas Corvée, and joined France national badminton team in 2016. In 2013, he won silver medal at the European Junior Badminton Championships in mixed team event. In 2016, he won silver medal at the European Men's Team Championships in Kazan, Russia.

Achievements

BWF International Challenge/Series 
Men's doubles

Mixed doubles

  BWF International Challenge tournament
  BWF International Series tournament
  BWF Future Series tournament

References

External links 
 

1995 births
Living people
Sportspeople from Alençon
French male badminton players